Claude White may refer to:

 Claude Grahame-White (1879–1959), English pioneer of aviation
 Claude White (footballer) (1904–1981), English footballer
 Claude Porter White (1907–1975), American author and composer